The Accidental Teacher Life Lessons from My Silent Son by Annie Lubliner Lehmann is an autism memoir. It was originally self-published in 2008, and then published in 2009 by The University of Michigan Press. It is a general overview of the author's life with her family, including her autistic eldest son Jonah.

The book has been reviewed by the Detroit News.

References

Books about autism
2008 non-fiction books
University of Michigan Press books